Dalry and West Kilbride was one of ten wards used to elect members of the North Ayrshire council between 2007 and 2022. Covering the small towns of West Kilbride just inland from the Firth of Clyde coast and Dalry approximately  further east, plus its rural hinterland, it elected three councillors. It was unaffected by a national boundary review prior to the 2017 local elections, but after the introduction of the Islands (Scotland) Act 2018, North Ayrshire's wards were re-organised for the 2022 election: West Kilbride was re-assigned to the North Coast ward, and Dalry going to the Kilbirnie and Beith ward which was consequently re-named Garnock Valley to reflect its wider scope (Dalry is closer to Beith and Kilbirnie both geographically and socially), both entities now electing five councillors.

Councillors

Election Results

2017 Election
2017 North Ayrshire Council election

2012 Election
2012 North Ayrshire Council election

2007 Election
2007 North Ayrshire Council election

References

Wards of North Ayrshire
Dalry, North Ayrshire
2022 disestablishments in Scotland